Anas Osama Mahmoud (born May 9, 1995) is an Egyptian professional basketball player who plays for Al Ittihad Alexandria of the Egyptian Basketball Super League. He played college basketball at the University of Louisville. He represents the Egypt national basketball team.

High school career
Mahmoud attended West Oaks Academy in Orlando, Florida for his senior year of high school. After garnering interest from college programs such as Cincinnati, Minnesota, Georgia Tech, and Louisville, Mahmoud signed a letter of intent to play and study at the University of Louisville on April 22, 2014.

College career
Mahmoud enrolled at Louisville on June 30, 2014. In Mahmoud's freshman season, he played in 30 games and averaged 1.2 points, 1.4 rebounds, and 0.7 blocks per game in 7.9 minutes per game. Mahmoud's sophomore season was cut short by a foot injury in mid-February 2016.

|-
|style="text-align:left;"|2014–15
|style="text-align:left;"|Louisville
|30||2||7.9||.400||.000||.750||1.4||.4||.1||.7||1.2
|-
|style="text-align:left;"|2015–16
|style="text-align:left;|Louisville
|22||2||13.1||.470||.000||.400||3.0||.5||.5||1.3||3.2
|-
|style="text-align:left;"|2016–17
|style="text-align:left;|Louisville
|31||16||18.7||.620||.000||.642||4.0||.8||.9||2.1||5.7
|-
|style="text-align:left;"|2017–18
|style="text-align:left;"|Louisville
|36||22||23.4||.550||.000||.500||5.0||1.0||.8||2.9||6.8
|}

Professional career
After going undrafted in the 2018 NBA draft, Mahmoud signed with the Memphis Grizzlies for the NBA Summer League. On August 25, 2018, Mahmoud returned to Egypt to sign his first professional contract with Zamalek.

Mahmoud was on the Zamalek roster for the 2021 BAL season and helped his team win the first-ever BAL championship. He led the team in steals and blocks and was named the BAL Defensive Player of the Year at the end of the season. In the same 2020–21 season, Mahmoud won his second Super League title and was named the MVP of the competition for the first time.

In August 2021, Mahmoud played for the Toronto Raptors for the NBA Summer League. He was the first BAL player to ever play in the NBA Summer League.

On May 29, 2022, Mahmoud extended his contract with Zamalek for two more seasons, until 2024. In October 2022, he changed teams when he signed for Al Ittihad Alexandria in a reported three-year deal.

International career
Mahmoud represented Egypt in the 2012 FIBA Under-17 World Championship, where he averaged 5.4 ppg, 4.0 rpg and 2.1 bpg.
He also represented Egypt in the AfroBasket 2013 and AfroBasket 2021.

BAL career statistics

|-
|style="text-align:left;background:#afe6ba;"|2021†
|style="text-align:left;"|Zamalek
| 6 || 6 || 25.4 || .636 || 1.000 || .231 || 6.8 || 4.8 || 2.3 || style="background:#cfecec;"| 2.8* || 7.7
|-
|style="text-align:left;"|2022
|style="text-align:left;"|Zamalek
| 8 || 8 || 28.7 || .632 || – || .389 || 9.8 || 3.5 || .8 || 2.4 || 9.9

Awards and accomplishments

Club career
Zamalek
BAL champion: (2021)
 2× Egyptian Super League: (2019, 2021)

Individual
 All-BAL First Team (2021)
 BAL Defensive Player of the Year (2021)
 Egyptian League MVP (2021)
 ACC All-Defensive Team (2018)

References

1995 births
Living people
Centers (basketball)
Egyptian expatriate sportspeople in the United States
Egyptian men's basketball players
Egyptian expatriate basketball people in the United States
Louisville Cardinals men's basketball players
Sportspeople from Giza
Zamalek SC basketball players
Al Ittihad Alexandria Club basketball players